The Rockwell Ranger 2000 was a jet trainer candidate for the United States Joint Primary Aircraft Training System proposed by Rockwell International with assistance from Rhein-Flugzeugbau GmbH (RFB) in Germany.

Design and development

The United States military issued a Request for proposal for a jet trainer for use by the United States Air Force and United States Navy. Rockwell responded with the Ranger 2000 two-seat, single engined cantilever monoplane. The design was based on the work of RFB, in particular the RFB Fantrainer and the prototypes were built in Germany.

The Ranger 2000 was powered by a Pratt & Whitney Canada JT15D-5C turbofan mounted in the rear fuselage and fed by two air intakes above the wing roots. It used retractable tricycle landing gear, the wing was straight and low-mounted, and the crew of two sat in tandem with the rear instructor raised to maintain visibility. Both crew had a Stencel zero-zero ejection seat.

The aircraft first flew on 15 January 1993 at Manching in Germany. The second prototype was lost in an accident on 25 July 1993. The first prototype was shipped to Rockwell in the United States but the first flight of the third prototype was delayed until 20 June 1994 for modification, the main change was the move of the speedbrakes from the upper wing surface to the rear fuselage.

The Ranger 2000 did not succeed in the competition, which was won by a variant of the Pilatus PC-9 which became the T-6 Texan II.

Aircraft on display
One of the Ranger 2000s is displayed at the Tulsa Air and Space Museum.

Specifications

See also

References
Notes

Bibliography

RFB aircraft
Ranger 2000
1990s United States military trainer aircraft
Single-engined jet aircraft
Low-wing aircraft
Aircraft first flown in 1993